Kristen S. Gonzalez (born August 6, 1995) is an American politician who is a member of the New York State Senate. A member of the Democratic Party, she represents the 59th district, which contains parts of Queens, Manhattan, and Brooklyn.

Early life and education 
Gonzalez was born in Elmhurst, Queens.

New York State Senate

2022 election 
In the race for the state Senate, Kristen Gonzalez defeated Elizabeth Crowley to represent parts of the East Side of Manhattan, western Queens, and Brooklyn.

Electoral history 

| colspan="6" style="text-align:center;background-color: #e9e9e9;"| Democratic primary

| colspan="6" style="text-align:center;background-color: #e9e9e9;"| General election

References

External links 
Campaign website

Living people
21st-century American politicians
Activists from New York City
American democratic socialists
Democratic Socialists of America politicians from New York
Democratic Party New York (state) state senators
New York (state) socialists
Politicians from New York City
Politicians from Queens, New York
Year of birth missing (living people)